Swagg (also Swag) is an unincorporated community in Randolph County, Alabama, United States.

A post office was once located there.

The Bethel West Church and Cemetery is located in Swagg.

References

Unincorporated communities in Randolph County, Alabama
Unincorporated communities in Alabama